John Gould (1804–1881) was an English ornithologist. 

John Gould may also refer to:

John Gould (of Seaborough) (fl. 1391), English MP from Somerset
John Gould (MP) (c.1695–1740), English politician from Essex and Hertfordshire
John Gould (Latter Day Saints) (1784–1855), early Latter Day Saint leader
John Stanton Gould (1810–1874), American Quaker scientist and philanthropist
John Edgar Gould (1821–1875), American hymnist and composer
John Gould (cricketer) (1872–1908), Australian cricketer
John Gould (columnist) (1908–2003), United States humorist
John Groves Gould (1912–2002), lawyer and politician in British Columbia, Canada
John Gould (footballer) (born 1919), Scottish footballer
John Gould (classicist) (1927–2001), British classical scholar
John Gould (ice hockey) (born 1947), played 504 NHL games
John Gould (Canadian writer) (born 1959), Canadian short story writer and University of Victoria faculty member
J.J. Gould (John Jamesen Gould, born 1971), Canadian journalist

See also
Jonathan Gould (born 1968), English footballer 
Jonathan Gould (presenter) (born 1961), British television presenter 
Jonny Gould, British radio presenter